The Pulitzer Prize for Fiction is one of the seven American Pulitzer Prizes that are annually awarded for Letters, Drama, and Music. It recognizes distinguished fiction by an American author, preferably dealing with American life, published during the preceding calendar year. 

As the Pulitzer Prize for the Novel (awarded 1918–1947), it was one of the original Pulitzers; the program was inaugurated in 1917 with seven prizes, four of which were awarded that year  (no Novel prize was awarded in 1917, the first one having been granted in 1918).

The name was changed to the Pulitzer Prize for Fiction in 1948, and eligibility was expanded to also include short stories, novellas, novelettes, and poetry, as well as novels.

Finalists have been announced since 1980, usually a total of three.

Definition
As defined in the original Plan of Award, the prize was given "Annually, for the American novel published during the year which shall best present the wholesome atmosphere of American life, and the highest standard of American manners and manhood," although there was some struggle over whether the word wholesome should be used instead of whole, the word Pulitzer had written in his will. In 1927, the advisory board quietly instituted Pulitzer's word choice, replacing wholesome with whole.

With 1929 came the first of several much more substantive changes. The board changed the wording to "preferably one which shall best present the whole atmosphere of American life" and deleted the insistence that the novel portray "the highest standard of American manners and manhood". In 1936, emphasis was changed again, with the award going to "a distinguished novel published during the year by an American author, preferably dealing with American life". In 1948, the advisory board widened the scope of the award with the wording "For distinguished fiction published in book form during the year by an American author, preferably dealing with American life." This change allowed the prize to go to a collection of short stories for the first time, James Michener's Tales of the South Pacific.

Winners
In 31 years under the "Novel" name, the prize was awarded 27 times; in its first 69 years to 2016 under the "Fiction" name, 62 times. There have been 11 years during which no title received the award. It has never been shared by two authors. Four writers have won two prizes each in the Fiction category: Booth Tarkington, William Faulkner, John Updike, and Colson Whitehead.

1910s to 1970s

1980s to 2020s
Entries from this point on include the finalists listed for each year.

Repeat winners
Four writers to date have won the Pulitzer Prize for Fiction multiple times, one nominally in the novel category and two in the general fiction category. Ernest Hemingway was selected by the 1941 and 1953 juries, but the former was overturned with no award given that year.

 Booth Tarkington, 1919, 1922
 William Faulkner, 1955, 1963 (awarded posthumously)
 John Updike, 1982, 1991
 Colson Whitehead, 2017, 2020

Authors with multiple nominations

4 Nominations

 Joyce Carol Oates
 Philip Roth

3 Nominations

 Alice McDermott
 Anne Tyler
 Colson Whitehead

2 Nominations

 Russell Banks
 Raymond Carver
 Don DeLillo
 E. L. Doctorow
 Louise Erdrich
 Richard Ford
 Adam Haslett
 Oscar Hijuelos
 Ha Jin
 Denis Johnson
 Richard Powers
 Annie Proulx
 Marilynne Robinson
 Robert Stone
 John Updike

Notes

References

External links

 Official website for Pulitzer Prize: for the Novel and for Fiction
 
The Pulitzer Prize Thumbnails Project
 Michael's Cunningham's "Letter from the Pulitzer Fiction Jury: What Really Happened This Year," The New Yorker — Part One (July 9, 2012) and Part Two (July 10, 2012)

English-language literary awards
Fiction
Awards established in 1918
American fiction awards